This article lists compositions written for the viola.  The list includes works in which the viola is a featured instrument: viola solo, viola and piano, viola and orchestra, ensemble of violas, etc.  Catalogue number, date of composition and publisher (for copyrighted works) are also included.  Ordering is by composer surname.

This pages lists composers whose surname falls into the S alphabetic range.  For others, see respective pages:
 List of compositions for viola: A to B
 List of compositions for viola: C to E
 List of compositions for viola: F to H
 List of compositions for viola: I to K
 List of compositions for viola: L to N
 List of compositions for viola: O to R
 List of compositions for viola: T to Z

S

Sa
 Kaija Saariaho (b. 1952)
     Vent Nocturne for solo viola and electronics (2006); Chester Music
     Je sens un deuxième coeur for viola, cello and piano (2003); Chester Music
     New Gates for flute, viola and harp (1996); Chester Music
 Peter Sacco (1928–2000)
     Sequence for viola and piano, Op. 138 (1966); Ostara Press
 Harald Sæverud (1897–1992)
     Sonatina for viola and piano (1989); Music Information Centre Norway
 Camille Saint-Saëns (1835–1921)
     Le cygne (The Swan) from The Carnival of the Animals for viola or viola d'amore and piano (1886); adaptation by Louis van Waefelghem (1895?)
     Sérénade for viola and piano, Op. 16 No. 2 (1862); original for cello and piano; adaptation by Louis van Waefelghem
 Philip Sainton (1891–1967)
     Crépuscule for viola and piano (1935); Boosey & Hawkes
     Lament for violin or viola and piano (1926); Augener Editions
     Phantom Gavotte for viola and piano; Modus Music
     Sérénade Fantastique for viola and orchestra (1935)
 Aulis Sallinen (b. 1935)
     Concerto for clarinet, viola and chamber orchestra, Op. 91 (2007); Novello & Co.
 Erkki Salmenhaara (1941–2002)
     Elegie IV in C minor for viola solo (1967); Edition Fazer; Fennica Gehrman; Warner/Chappell Music Finland
     Poema for solo violin (or viola, or cello) and string orchestra (1975); Edition Fazer; Fennica Gehrman; Warner/Chappell Music Finland
 Esa-Pekka Salonen (b. 1958)
     Pentatonic Étude for viola solo (2008, revised 2014); Chester Music
 Timothy Salter (b. 1942)
     Mosaics for flute (piccolo), viola and harp (1991); Usk Edition
     Declamation for viola solo (2002); Usk Edition
     Prelude and Fugue for viola (or clarinet) and piano (1976); Usk Edition
 Leonard Salzedo (1921–2000)
     Concerto for viola and orchestra, Op. 100 (1983)
     Eves Apologie, Cantata for mezzo soprano, viola and string orchestra, Op. 125 (1993); words by Emilia Lanier
     Sonata for violin and viola, Op. 132 (1995)
 Gustave Samazeuilh (1877–1967)
     Deux pièces brèves (2 Short Pieces) (1947); Éditions Durand; Elkan-Vogel
        Lamento for viola (or cello) solo
        D'un printemps heureux for viola (or cello) and piano
 Steven Sametz (b. 1954
     Two Songs for Lent for countertenor and viola (1973)
     Voices of Broken Hearts for female chorus and digitally delayed viola (2010); ECS Publishing
 Rhian Samuel (b. 1944)
     Blythswood, 3 Pieces for viola and piano (1998); Stainer & Bell
     Emerging (Lightly) for solo viola and chamber ensemble (2008); Stainer & Bell
     Stepping Out II, Trio for clarinet, viola and piano (2000); Stainer & Bell
     Through Windows and the Balustrades Beyond for flute, viola and harp (1998); Stainer & Bell
     Time Out of Time: Little Suite for viola and piano (2001); original for cello and piano; Stainer & Bell
 Lars Sandberg (b. 1955)
     Väntans svit: musik till dikter av Birgitta Lillpers (Väntans Suite: Music to Poems of Birgitta Lillpers) for viola solo (1998); Swedish Music Information Centre
 Adolf Sandberger (1864–1943)
     Trio-Sonata in C minor for violin, viola and piano, Op. 4 (1889)
 Luis Sandi (1905–1996)
     Hoja de álbum 2 for viola and piano (1986); Ediciones Mexicanas de Música
     Miniaturas (Miniatures) for viola solo (1994); Liga de Compositores de México
 Dalmazio Santini (1923–2001)
     Concerto for viola and orchestra (1980)
 Cláudio Santoro (1919–1989)
     Adágio for viola and piano (1946, 1965); Edition Savart
     Concerto No. 1 for viola and orchestra (1988); Edition Savart
     Duo for violin and viola (1982); Edition Savart
     Duo for female voice and viola (1987); Edition Savart
     Espaços (Space) for viola and piano (1966); Edition Savart
     Fantasia Sul America for viola solo (1983); Edition Savart
     Fantasia Sul America for viola and orchestra (1983); Edition Savart
     Mutationen IV for viola and tape (1971–1972); Edition Savart
     Paródia for voice, viola, and other instruments (piano, percussion) ad libitum (1982); Edition Savart
     Sonata No. 1 for viola and piano (1943); unfinished
     Sonata No. 2 for viola and piano (1982); Edition Savart
 Guido Santórsola (1904–1994)
     Canção triste e dança brasileira for viola and piano or orchestra (1934)
     Chôro No. 1 in G major for viola (or violin) and piano (1944)
     Chôro No. 2 in G major for violin or viola and piano (or orchestra) (1952); Bèrben Edizioni Musicali
     Concerto for viola and orchestra with mixed chorus and viola d'amore (1932–1933)
     Díptico for viola (or violin) and guitar (1970); Editora Novas Metas
     3 Estados psicológicos for violin or viola and orchestra (1936)
     Mangangá, Study for viola solo (1953)
     Preludio y fuga a la manera clásica for 2 violas and double bass (1937)
     Sonata in D minor for violin or viola and piano (1928); Bèrben Edizioni Musicali
     Sonata-fantasía for viola and orchestra (or piano) (1938)
     Trio for flute, viola and piano (1969)
 Joly Braga Santos (1924–1988)
     Cançaõ for viola and piano (1971); AvA Musical Editions
     Nocturne in B minor for viola and string orchestra, Op. 11 (1947)
     Concerto for viola and orchestra, Op. 31 (1960)
 Jerzy Sapieyevski (b. 1945)
     Concerto for Viola and Winds; Mercury Music; Theodore Presser Company
 Allen Sapp (1922–1999)
     Colloquies II for flute, viola and piano (1978)
     First Viola Sonata for viola and piano (1948); American Composers Alliance
 Ruben Sargsyan (Ruben Sarkisyan) (1945–2013)
     Concerto for viola and chamber orchestra (1992)
 László Sáry (b. 1940)
     Diana búcsúja (Diana's Farewell) for 8 violins and 8 violas (1976); Editio Musica Budapest
     For Viola or Cello: Hommage à Philip Glass for viola or cello solo (1977); Editio Musica Budapest
 Henri Sauguet (1901–1989)
     Trois Pièces (3 Pieces) for viola solo (1972); Symétrie
     Musique pour Cendrars for baritone and viola (1986); Symétrie
 Ernest Sauter (1928–2013)
     Essai sur "l'accord prométhéen" for viola solo and string trio (1988); Walter Wollenweber Verlag; revision for viola solo and string orchestra (2000); Edition Kunzelmann
     Sonata for viola solo (1974); Walter Wollenweber Verlag
 Eugène Sauzay (1809–1901)
     Pièce en trio in G major for violin, viola and piano, Op. 7 (published 1855)
 David Sawer (b. 1961)
     Parthenope for viola solo (2003); Universal Edition
 Robert Saxton (b. 1953)
     Invocation, Dance and Meditation for viola and piano (1991); Chester Music
     Concerto for viola and orchestra (1986); Chester Music
 Fazıl Say (b. 1970)
     Ruşen Güneş Anısına (In Memoriam Ruşen Güneş), Sonata for viola solo, Op. 92 (2020); Schott Music
 Ahmed Adnan Saygun (1907–1991)
     Concerto for viola and orchestra, Op. 59 (1976–1977); Peermusic Classical
 Bruce Saylor (b. 1946)
     Duo for violin and viola (1970); King's Crown Music Press; Galaxy Music Corporation; Columbia University Music Press; Subito Music

Sc
 Alessandro Scarlatti (1660–1725)
     Aria "Vaga rosa tenerella" for voice, viola d'amore or viola and harpsichord or piano (1680); transcription by Louis van Waefelghem (1899)
 Andrea Lorenzo Scartazzini (b. 1971)
     Cammina cammina for mezzo-soprano, viola and theorbo (1996); words by Giuseppe Ungaretti; Bärenreiter Verlag
 Giacinto Scelsi (1905–1988)
     Cœlocanth, 3 Movements for viola solo (1955); Éditions Salabert
     Elegia per Ty for viola and cello (1958); Éditions Salabert
     Manto for a violist-singer (1957); Éditions Salabert
     Three Studies for viola solo (1956); Éditions Salabert
 Theodor Schaefer (1904–1969)
     Diathema for viola and orchestra, Op. 24 (1955–1956); Český Hudební Fond
 Bogusław Schaeffer (1929–2019
     Concerto for viola and chamber orchestra (2004)
     Concerto for viola and orchestra (1997); Collsch Edition
     Kreuzweg 11 for saxophone, accordion, percussion and viola (2003)
     Monophonie II for 13 violas (1997); Collsch Edition
     Mouhadatsa for viola and cello (1985); Collsch Edition
     Quartet for 4 violas (2006)
     Salzburg Spectres for 4 violas (2005)
     Sonata for viola solo (1991); Collsch Edition
     Spring Music for viola and piano (1988); Collsch Edition
 R. Murray Schafer (1933–2021)
     Buskers for flute, violin and viola (1985); Arcana Editions; Canadian Music Centre
     Concerto for viola and orchestra (1997); Arcana Editions; Canadian Music Centre
     Rounds for flute, violin and viola (1985); Canadian Music Centre
 Philipp Scharwenka (1847–1917)
     Arie in F major for viola and piano or harmonium, Op. 51 (1883, 1897); originally for cello or violin and piano
     Sonata Fantasia in G minor for viola and piano, Op. 106 (1898)
     Trio No. 1 (Duo) in A minor (major) for violin, viola and piano, Op. 105 (1898)
     Trio No. 2 in E minor for violin, viola and piano, Op. 121 (1915)
 Gerhard Schedl (1957–2000)
     Concertino for viola and piano (1976); Verlag Doblinger
     Concerto for viola and orchestra (1988); Verlag Doblinger
 Michael Schelle (b. 1950)
     The Viola the Wind Swept Away for viola and chamber ensemble (2007)
 Friedrich Schenker (1942–2013)
     Concerto for viola and orchestra (1975); Breitkopf und Härtel
     Foglio I for viola and cello (1982); Deutscher Verlag für Musik; Breitkopf und Härtel
 Tona Scherchen (b. 1938)
     Lien (恋) for viola solo (1973); Universal Edition
     Tao for viola solo and orchestra (1971–1972); Universal Edition
     Yun-yu (云雨; Clouds and Rain; Nuages et pluie) for violin or viola and vibraphone (1974); Universal Edition
 Armin Schibler (1920–1986)
     Ballade for viola and piano, Op. 54 (1957); Edition Kunzelmann
     Fantasie for viola and chamber orchestra, Op. 15 (1945); Ahn & Simrock
     Kleines Konzert for viola solo, Op. 9d (1951); Ahn & Simrock
     Weil alles erneut sich begibt for low voice, viola and piano, Op. 23 (1949); Edition Eulenburg
Peter Schickele (b. 1935); see also P.D.Q. Bach
     Deep Funk, Part 2, Dance Sonata for solo viola (2002); Theodore Presser Company
     Monochrome IV for 6 violas (1974); Theodore Presser Company
     Little London Trio for 2 violins and viola (1985); Theodore Presser Company
     Little Suite for Autumn for violin and viola (1979); Theodore Presser Company
     River Music for viola and cello (1993); Theodore Presser Company
     Top o' the Millennium for 2 violas (2000); available from composer
     Windows, Three Pieces for viola and guitar (1966); Theodore Presser Company
 David Schiff (b. 1945)
     Joycesketch II for solo viola (1981); MMB Music
 Helmut Schiff (1918–1982)
     Sonata for viola and piano (1960); Doblinger
 Hans Schläger (1820–1885)
     Nachtstück (Night Piece) in C minor for viola (or cello) and piano, Op. 32 (1872)
 Thomas Daniel Schlee (b. 1957)
     Alba for flute and viola, Op. 26 (1986); Éditions Henry Lemoine
     De Profundis for viola and double bass, Op. 43 (2000); Éditions Henry Lemoine
 Martin Schlumpf (b. 1947); Martin Schlumpf website
     "... per la quinta vox..." for viola solo (1986)
     Spiegelbilder for viola, cello and piano (2013)
     Trio for flute, viola and harp (1970)
 Heinrich Kaspar Schmid (1874–1953)
     Sonata for viola and piano, Op. 111 (1941)
     Trio for clarinet, viola and piano, Op. 114 (1944)
     Trio for flute, viola and piano, Op. 109 (1940)
 William Schmidt (1926–2009)
     Sonata Breve for flute, clarinet and viola (c.1966); Western International Music
     Sonata in Two Movements for viola and piano (1968); Avant Music; Western International Music
 Thomas Schmidt-Kowalski (1949–2013)
     Concerto in F minor for viola and orchestra, Op. 111 (2010)
     Duo in D major for violin and viola, Op. 43 (1992)
     Duo in C major for horn and viola, Op. 65 No. 2 (1998)
     Élégie in F minor for viola and orchestra, Op. 107 (2007–2008)
     3 Fantasiestücke (3 Fantasy Pieces) in C major for viola and piano, Op. 55 (1992)
     Konzertantes Duo in Form einer frei variierten Passacaglia (Duo Concertante in the Form of a Freely Varied Passacaglia) for violin and viola, Op. 52 (1994)
     Sonata in C major for viola and piano, Op. 39 (1992)
 Florent Schmitt (1870–1958)
     Légende for viola and orchestra, Op. 66 (1918); Éditions Durand
 Joseph Schmitt (1734–1791)
     Concerto in C major for viola and orchestra
 Artur Schnabel (1882–1951)
     3 Fantasiestücke (3 Fantasy Pieces) for violin, viola and piano (1898)
 Georg Abraham Schneider (1770–1839)
     Concerto in C major for viola and orchestra (1799)
     Duo in D major for viola and cello, Op. 15
     3 Duos for viola with violin accompaniment, Op. 30
     3 Duos for violin and viola, Op. 44; F.E.C. Leuckart
     3 Grands duos concertants for violin and viola, Op. 4 (c.1795)
     Sinfonia Concertante in D major for violin, viola and orchestra, Op. 19
     3 Sonatas for viola with violin accompaniment, Op. 18
     6 Solos for alto viola, Op. 19 (1804)
 Michael Schneider (b. 1964)
     Es werde Licht (Let There Be Light) for viola solo (2000); Édition Musicale Suisse
     Shark Turtle Ray for oboe, viola and guitar (1998–1999); Édition Musicale Suisse
 Alfred Schnittke (1934–1998)
     Concerto for viola and orchestra (1985); Hans Sikorski
     Herrn Alfred Schlee zum 90. Geburstag (For the 90th Birthday of Alfred Schlee) for solo viola (1991); Universal Edition
     Konzert zu dritt (Concerto for Three) for violin, viola, cello and chamber orchestra (1994); Hans Sikorski
     Monologue for viola and string orchestra (1989); Hans Sikorski
     Piece (Concerto) for viola and chamber orchestra (1997)
     Sonata No. 1 for cello and piano (1978); arrangement for viola and string orchestra by Yuri Bashmet
 Othmar Schoeck (1886–1957)
     Andante for clarinet or viola and piano; Hug Musikverlage
 Paul Schoenfield (b. 1947)
     Concerto for viola and orchestra (1997–1998); Migdal Publishing
 Johannes Schöllhorn (b. 1962)
     musarion for viola solo (1985–1986); Éditions Henry Lemoine
 Robert Schollum (1913–1987)
     Chaconne for viola and piano, Op. 54a (1954); Verlag Doblinger
     3 kleine Stücke (3 Little Pieces) for viola and piano, Op. 125 (1987); Verlag Doblinger
     Sonate for viola and piano, Op. 42 No. 2 (1950); Verlag Doblinger
     Sonatine for viola and piano, Op. 57 No. 2 (1962); Verlag Doblinger
     3 Stücke for flute, violin, viola and string orchestra, Op. 51a; Verlag Doblinger
 Carl Siegemund Schönebeck (1758–1804)
     3 Duos for viola and cello, Op. 2 (1798); Amadeus Verlag
     3 konzertante Duos (3 Concertante Duos) for 2 violas, Op. 13
 Ruth Schönthal (1924–2006)
     Duo for clarinet or viola and cello (2002); Furore Verlag
     Four Epiphanies for unaccompanied viola (1976); Oxford University Press
     Sonata Concertante for cello or viola or clarinet and piano (1973); Furore Verlag
     Two Duets for violin and viola (2002); Furore Verlag
 Hans-Hubert Schönzeler (1925–1997)
     Sonata for viola and piano, Op. 5 (1975); Edition Eulenburg
 Hanning Schröder (1896–1987)
     Divertimento for viola and cello (1963); Edition Peters
     Duo-Sonate for flute (or violin) and viola (1955); Verlag Friedrich Hofmeister
     Ein-zwei-dreistimmige Kammermusik (One-, Two-, and Three-Voiced Chamber Music) for 2 violins and viola (1968); Edition Peters
     Musik in 5 Sätzen (Music in 5 Movements) for viola solo (1954); Robert Lienau Musikverlag
     Serenade for 3 violas; Edition Peters
     Variationen über das Volkslied "Ach bittrer Winter" (Variations on the German Folk Song "Ach bittrer Winter") for viola and cello (1950); Robert Lienau Musikverlag
 Hermann Schroeder (1904–1984)
     Duo for violin and viola (1979)
     Sonata for viola solo (1974); Musikverlage Gerig; Breitkopf und Härtel
     Concerto in A major for viola and orchestra, Op. 45 (1970); Musikverlage Gerig; Breitkopf und Härtel
 François Schubert (1808–1878)
     La Solitude, Étude d'expression for viola and piano; arrangement by Casimir Ney (published ca. 1851)
 Franz Schubert (1797–1828)
     Ave Maria (1825); transcription for viola and piano by William Primrose; Edition Schott
     Impromptu in G major, Op. 90 No. 3 (1827); transcription for viola and piano by Vadim Borisovsky
     La Solitude (Einsamkeit), Mélodie de Schubert for viola and piano, D. 620 (1818); original for voice and piano; transcription by Casimir Ney
     Litany for All Souls' Day (Litanei auf das Fest Aller Seelen), D. 343 (1816); transcription for viola and piano by William Primrose; Edition Schott
     Sonata in A minor "Arpeggione" for viola and piano, D. 821 (1824); original for arpeggione and piano
 Joseph Schubert (1754–1837)
     Concerto in C major for viola and orchestra
 Zikmund Schul (1916–1944)
     Duo for violin and viola (1943); Bote & Bock
     2 Chasidské tance (2 Chassidic Dances) for viola and cello, Op. 15 (1941–1942); Bote & Bock
 Erwin Schulhoff (1894–1942)
     Concertino for flute, viola and double bass (1925); Universal Edition
 Gunther Schuller (1925–2015)
     Concerto for viola and orchestra (1985); Associated Music Publishers
 Andrew Schultz (b. 1960)
     Attack for viola solo (1990); Wirripang; Australian Music Centre
     Duo Variations for viola and piano (1990); Australian Music Centre
     Master Mariner, Dead at Sea for viola and piano (2005); Wirripang; Australian Music Centre
     Stick Dance II for clarinet, viola and piano (1989, revised 2005); Australian Music Centre
 Robert Schumann (1810–1856)
     Märchenbilder (Fairy Tale Pictures) for viola and piano, Op. 113 (1851)
     Märchenerzählungen, 4 movements for clarinet, viola and piano, Op. 132 (1853)
 William Schuman (1910–1992)
     Concerto on Old English Rounds for viola, female chorus and orchestra (1974); Theodore Presser Company
 Gerard Schurmann (1924–2020)
     Canzonetta for viola and piano (2010); Novello
 Meinrad Schütter (1910–2006)
     Duo Concertante "Quasi una Fantasia" for violin, viola and orchestra (1966)
     Fragment for viola and piano (1957, 1997)
     Humoreske (Hommage à Francis Poulenc) for viola and piano (1989, 1996); original for clarinet and piano
     Serenade "Gute Nacht, gute Nacht! Liebchen sieh" for soprano, flute and viola (1934)
     Widmung (Dedication) for 2 violins and viola (1969)
 Kurt Schwaen (1909–2007)
     Sechs Variationen für 2 Saiteninstrumente (6 Variations for 2 String Instruments) for violin and viola, KSV 545 (1990)
     Serenata for 4 violas (solo viola and 3 tutti violas), KSV 607/3 (1998); original for 4 violins; Verlag Neue Musik
     Weiße Katze / Schnurrige Geschichte for viola and piano, KSV 381a (1975); Verlag Neue Musik
 Elliott Schwartz (1936–2016)
     Alto Prisms for 8 violas (1997); American Composers Alliance
     Aria No. 3 for viola and woodblocks (1972); Carl Fischer
     Aria with Interruptions for viola and percussion (1993); American Composers Alliance
     Echo Music I for clarinet, viola and self-prepared tape (1977); Carl Fischer
     Suite for viola and piano (1963); Norruth-MMB
     Three Inventions in a Name for viola solo (1985); American Composers Alliance
     Vienna Dreams for clarinet, viola and piano (1998); American Composers Alliance
 Cornelius Schwehr (b. 1953)
     acompagnato (mutuo) for viola and accordion (2001); Breitkopf & Härtel
     à nous deux, Concerto for viola, piano and orchestra (1995); Breitkopf & Härtel
 Alfred Schweizer (b. 1941)
     Dorischer Gesang for baritone, cello (or viola, or horn) and piano (1996); Müller & Schade
     Glasfarbenmusik, Chamber Music for soprano, viola and organ (2003); Müller & Schade
     Juli. "Jodel" from the cycle Das Jahr in naiver Musik for violin and viola (1976–1996); Müller & Schade
     Lydischer Gesang for soprano or mezzo-soprano, violin or viola and piano (1999); Müller & Schade
     Musik for viola solo (2001); Müller & Schade
 Rolf Schweizer (1936–2016)
     Hymnus I for viola and percussion (1988); Edition Dohr
     Hymnus II for viola solo (1989); Edition Dohr
 Kurt Schwertsik (b. 1935)
     Haydn Lived in Eisenstadt for viola and piano, Op. 122 (2020); Boosey & Hawkes
 Salvatore Sciarrino (b. 1947)
     Ai limiti della notte for viola solo (1979); G. Ricordi
     3 Duetti con l'eco for flute, viola and bassoon (2006); Edizioni Musicali Rai Trade
     La malinconia for violin and viola (1980); G. Ricordi
     3 Notturni brillanti for viola solo (1974); G. Ricordi
 Stefano Scodanibbio (1956–2012)
     Composte terre for violin and viola (1991–1992)
     Humboldt for viola and double bass (1993–1994, revised 1997)
     Quodlibet for viola and cello (1991)
     Tre Impromptu (3 Impromptus) for viola solo (1986–1989)
 Flavio Emilio Scogna (b. 1956)
     Color for viola solo (2005)
     Diaphonia for viola solo, string orchestra and piano (1991); Edizioni Musicali RCA; Ricordi
     Incanto for 2 violins and viola (1985); Edizioni Musicali RCA; Ricordi
 Cyril Scott (1879–1970)
     Cherry Ripe for viola and piano (1911); original for violin and piano; arranged by Lionel Tertis
     Fantasia for viola and piano (ca.1911); incomplete
     Sonata for viola and piano (1939, revised 1953)
 Alexander Scriabin (1872–1915)
     Prélude in C minor, Op. 9 No. 1 (1894); 1931 transcription for viola and piano by Vadim Borisovsky; Paul Günther; International Music Company; Declaration of Love: Album of Popular Pieces for Viola and Piano (Страстное Признание: Альбом Популярных Пьес), Muzyka
 Peter Sculthorpe (1929–2014)
     Elegy for viola and string orchestra (2006); Faber Music
     Parting for viola and piano (2000); Faber Music
     Sonata for viola and percussion (1960); Faber Music
     A Song for Fé for viola and piano (2005); Faber Music
     Tailitnama Song for viola solo (1974, 2000) or viola and piano (2000); Faber Music

Se
 Peter Seabourne (b. 1960)
     Pietà for viola and piano (2007)
     Freeing the Angel for viola and piano (2019)
 Walter Sear (1930–2010)
     Sonata for viola solo
 Mátyás Seiber (1905–1960)
     Elegy for viola and small orchestra (1951–1953); Edition Schott
 Albert Seitz (1872–1937)
     Fantaisie de concert in D minor for viola and piano, Op. 31 (1904); Éditions Alphonse Leduc
 Bernhard Sekles (1872–1934)
     Chaconne über ein achttaktiges Marschthema (Chaconne on an Eight-Beat March Theme) for viola and piano, Op. 38 (1931); C.F. Peters
 Ronald Senator (1926–2015) 
     Polish Suite for viola solo (1991); Alfred Lengnick
 José Serebrier (b. 1938)
      Sonata for Viola Alone (1955); Southern Music Publishing
 Raminta Šerkšnytė (b. 1975)
     Nuojautos (Presentiments) for flute, viola and 1~4 prepared pianos (2002); Lithuanian Music Information and Publishing Centre
     Žvelgiant į pasąmonę (Looking at the Subconscious) for flute and viola (1997); Lithuanian Music Information and Publishing Centre
 Tibor Serly (1901–1978)
     La Bandoline for viola and piano (1947); transcription from François Couperin's Pièces de clavecin, 1er livre
     Concerto for viola and orchestra (1929); Sprague-Coleman; Peer Music
     David of the White Rock for viola solo; Sprague-Coleman
     Rhapsody on Folk Songs Harmonized by Béla Bartók for viola and orchestra (1946); Peer Music
     Sonata in Modus Lascivus for viola solo (1948); Southern Music Publishing
 Mordecai Seter (1916–1994)
     Elegy (אלגיה) for viola and piano or string orchestra (1954); Israel Music Institute
     Monodrama (מונודרמה) for viola and piano (1977); original for clarinet and piano from Chamber Music '70; Israel Music Institute
     Ricercar (ריצ'רקאר) for violin, viola, cello and string orchestra without double bass (1956); Israel Music Institute
     Two Ballades and Virelais by Solage (fl. 1370–1390) (שתי בלדות ווירלי מאת סולאז) for flute, viola and harp, or flute, trumpet, viola and cello; Israel Music Institute
     Two Ballades by Jacob de Senleches (fl. 1378–1395) (שתי בלדות מאת ג'קוב דה סנלצ'ס) for viola, cello and harp; Israel Music Institute
 John Laurence Seymour (1893–1986)
     Elegiac Tone Poem No. 2 in F minor for viola and piano (1946); Banner Play Bureau

Sh
 Stepan Shakaryan (1935–2019)
     Theme and Variations (Тема с вариациями) for viola and piano (1959)
 Ralph Shapey (1921–2002)
     Duo for viola and piano (1957); Theodore Presser Company
     Evocation No. 3 for viola and piano (1981); Theodore Presser Company
     Mann Duo for violin and viola (1983); Theodore Presser Company
     Night Music No. 2 for violin/viola (one player) and tape (2001); Theodore Presser Company
     Poeme for viola and percussion (1966); Theodore Presser Company
     Variations for Viola and Nine Players (1987); Theodore Presser Company
 Alex Shapiro (b. 1962)
     Desert Waves for 5-string electric violin (or viola) and electronic soundscape on CD (2001); Activist Music
     Evolve for 5-string electric viola and electronic soundscape on CD (2006); Activist Music
     Of String and Touch for viola and piano (2006); Activist Music
 Vache Sharafyan (b. 1966)
     Luminous Silhouette of a Song for clarinet (or viola) and chamber orchestra (2008); Editions BIM
     Path Towards This Moment for viola and organ (2012)
     Sonata-Fantasy for viola and piano (2010)
     Suite for viola and string orchestra with oboe (2009)
     Surgite Gloriae, Concerto for viola and orchestra with duduk, descant (singer), and baritone (2005)
     Vi-O-La No. 1 for viola solo (2008); A-RAM, Moscow
     Vi-O-La No. 2 for viola solo (2009); A-RAM, Moscow
     Light-Drop Peals for soprano and viola (2009); words by Matsuo Bashō
     Waterfall Music for mix chorus with optional viola (2011)
 Judith Shatin (b. 1949)
     Arche for viola and orchestra (1974)
     Doxa for viola and piano (1989); MMB Music
     Glyph for solo viola, string quartet and piano (1984); MMB Music
     L'étude du Cœur for viola solo (1983, revised 1987); C.F. Peters
     Sister Thou Wast Mild and Lovely for soprano and viola (1994); American Composers Alliance
     Wedding Song for soprano and English horn (or alto flute, or clarinet, or viola) (1987); American Composers Alliance
 Caroline Shaw (b. 1982)
     in manus tuas for cello or viola solo (2009)
 Rodion Shchedrin (b. 1932)
     Concerto Dolce for viola, string orchestra and harp, Op. 102 (1997); Schott Music
 Alexander Shchetynsky (b. 1960)
     Sonata for viola solo (1985–1987); Le Chant du Monde
     Four Movements (Чотири рухи) for clarinet, viola and piano (1996)
     Two Songs of a Wayfaring Philosopher (Дві пісні мандрованого філософа) for mezzo-soprano and viola d'amore or viola (2000, 2001)
 Vissarion Shebalin (1902–1963)
     Sonata in F minor for viola and piano, Op. 51 No. 2 (1954); Muzgiz; Röhr, Frankfurt
     Sonata in E minor for violin and viola, Op. 35 (1940–1944);  (State Music Publishing House); Leeds Music
 Bright Sheng (b. 1955)
     Angel Fire Duo for violin and viola (2014); G. Schirmer
     The Stream Flows for viola solo (1988); G. Schirmer
     Three Chinese Love Songs for soprano, viola and piano (1988); G. Schirmer
     Three Pieces for viola and piano (1986); G. Schirmer
 Noam Sheriff (1935–2018)
     Canarian Vespers for viola and string orchestra (2009); Edition Peters
     Partita (ליגור – פרטיטה) for viola and cello (1984); Israel Music Institute; Edition Peters
 Robert Sherlaw Johnson (1932–2000)
     Intersections for viola and piano (1988); Oxford University Press
 Hifumi Shimoyama (b. 1930)
     Duplication (デュプリケーション) for viola and guitar (2009)
 Motoyuki Shitanda (b. 1952)
     Concerto for viola and orchestra (1998)
     Retrospection (追憶 Tsuioku) for viola and piano (1997); Japan Federation of Composers
 Gil Shohat (b. 1973)
     Anekdotos III: Rêverie et Cauchmard for viola solo (2000); Gil Shohat Editions
     Concerto for viola and orchestra (1998); Ricordi
     The Devil's Dance, Ballet for violin and viola (2006); Gil Shohat Editions
     Duo-Sonata for violin and viola; Gil Shohat Editions
     Five Songs of Darkness for soprano, viola and piano (1990); Gil Shohat Editions
 Vladislav Shoot (1941–2022)
     Mini-Partita (Мини-партита) for viola and piano (1987)
 Bernard Shore (1896–1984)
     Scherzo for viola and piano; Augener
 Dmitri Shostakovich (1906–1975)
     Sonata for viola and piano, Op. 147 (1975); G. Schirmer; DSCH
     Adagio; transcription for viola and piano by Vadim Borisovsky; Sovetsky Kompozitor (1962)
     Impromptu (Экспромт) for viola and piano, Op. 33 [sic] (1931); DSCH
     Pieces from The Gadfly (Пьесы из музыки к кинофильму "Овод"), Op. 97 (1955); transcriptions for viola and piano by Vadim Borisovsky; Muzyka (1964); DSCH
          Overture
          Romance
          Contra-dance
          Barrel-Organ Waltz
          Nocturne
          Galop
     Spring Waltz (Весенний Вальс); transcription for viola and piano by Vadim Borisovsky; Sovietsky Kompozitor (1962)
 Petros Shoujounian (b. 1957)
     Arévagale (Rising Sun), Trio for viola, bassoon and horn (1991); Canadian Music Centre
     Monologue 1 for viola solo (1985); Doberman-Yppan; Canadian Music Centre
 Hugh Shrapnel (b. 1947)
     Variations for viola solo (1985)
 Alan Shulman (1915–2002)
     Homage to Erik Satie for viola and piano (1938)
     Piece in Popular Style for viola and piano (1939)
     Theme and Variations in B minor for viola, strings and harp (1940)
     Suite for solo viola (1953); Templeton Publishing
     Night for viola quartet (1978)
     Ancora for viola quartet (1978)
     Variations for viola, strings and harp (1981, revised 1984)
 Aleksandr Shymko (b. 1977)
     The Book of Night Secrets (Книга таємниць ночі) for flute, viola and harp (2005)
     Double Concerto (Двойной концерт) for violin, viola and orchestra (2013–2014)

Si
 Jean Sibelius (1865–1957)
     Duo in C major for violin and viola, JS 66 (c.1891–1892); Edition Fazer; Fennica Gehrman; Boosey & Hawkes
     Rondo in D minor for viola and piano, JS 162 (1893); Warner/Chappell Music
 Nikolai Sidelnikov (1930–1992)
     Sonata-Elegia (Соната-элегия) for viola solo (1978); Muzyka
  (1896–1978)
     Concertino in E minor for viola and string quartet, Op. 124; manuscript
     Duo Sonata in G major for viola and cello, Op. 139 (1949); Doblinger Verlag
     Duo Sonatina in F major for violin and viola, Op. 138 (1949); Doblinger Verlag
     Gesänge (Songs) for soprano, viola and piano, Op. 112; Anton Böhm & Sohn
     Sonata No. 1 for viola and piano, Op. 41 (1925); Doblinger Verlag
     Sonata No. 2 in E major for viola and piano, Op. 103 (1938); Doblinger Verlag
     Volkslieder (Folk Songs) for soprano, viola and piano, Op. 113; Anton Böhm & Sohn
     Weihnachts-Sonate (Christmas Sonata) in D major for viola and organ, Op. 137 (1944); Doblinger Verlag
 Elie Siegmeister (1909–1991)
     Songs of Experience for voice, viola and piano (1979); words by William Blake; C. Fischer
     Summer for viola and piano (1978)
 Roberto Sierra (b. 1953)
     Concerto for viola, string orchestra and percussion (2006); Subito Music
     Doble Concierto (Double Concerto) for violin, viola and orchestra (2003); Subito Music
 Þorkell Sigurbjörnsson (1938–2013)
     Farewell for flute, viola and harp (2007); Íslenzk Tónverkamiðstöð
     Intrada: Invitation to a Bath for clarinet, viola and piano (1971); Íslenzk Tónverkamiðstöð
     Kisum for clarinet, viola and piano (1970); Íslenzk Tónverkamiðstöð
     Six Icelandic Folk-Songs (Sex íslensk Þjóðlög) for viola and piano (1969); Íslenzk Tónverkamiðstöð
     Skref fyrir skref (Step-by-Step) for viola solo (1986); Íslenzk Tónverkamiðstöð
 Sheila Silver (b. 1946)
     Lullaby for bassoon (or viola) and piano (2004)
 Faye-Ellen Silverman (b. 1947)
     Memories for solo viola (1974); Seesaw Music
     Troubled Repose for flute, viola and double bass (1998); Seesaw Music
     Wilde's World for tenor, viola and guitar (2000); Seesaw Music
 Valentin Silvestrov (b. 1937)
     Epitaph L.B. (Епітафія Л.Б.; Epitaphium L.B.) for viola (or cello) and piano (1999); M.P. Belaieff
     Lacrimosa for viola (or cello) solo (2004)
 Thomas Simaku (b. 1958)
     a2 for viola and cello (2008); University of York Music Press
     Soliloquy III for viola solo (2002); University of York Music Press
     Tanglewood Trio for clarinet, viola and piano (1996); Emerson Edition
 Stasys Šimkus (1887–1943)
     Lopšinė (Lullaby) for viola and piano; published by Vaga, Vilnius (1966), in Dvi pjesės altui su fortepijonu (2 Pieces for Viola and Piano)
 Achille Simonetti (1859–1928)
     Allegretto Romantico in D minor for viola and piano (published 1897)
     Ballata in C minor for viola and piano (published 1897)
 Netty Simons (1913–1994)
     Facets No. 3 for viola or oboe and piano (1962); Merion Music; Theodore Presser Company
     Songs for Wendy for voice and viola (c.1975); Merion Music; Theodore Presser Company
     Trialogue I: The Tombstone Told When She Died for alto, baritone and viola (1963); words by Dylan Thomas; Merion Music; Theodore Presser Company
     Trialogue II: Myselves Grieve for alto, baritone and viola (1969); words by Dylan Thomas; Merion Music; Theodore Presser Company
     Trialogue III: Now (Now, Say Nay) for mezzo-soprano, baritone and viola (1973); words by Dylan Thomas; Merion Music; Theodore Presser Company
 Ezra Sims (1928–2015)
     — and, as I was saying, ... for viola solo (1979); Diapason Press; American Composers Alliance; Frogpeak
     Concert Piece for viola solo with flute, clarinet, cello and small orchestra (1990); Frogpeak
     Duo for viola and cello (1996)
     Duo '97 for clarinet and viola (1997)
     — furthermore ... for clarinet and viola (2005); Frogpeak
     The Lullaby in Come Away for mezzo-soprano and viola (or violin) (1980); American Composers Alliance; Frogpeak
     Song for mezzo-soprano, clarinet and viola (1980); Frogpeak
     5 Songs for alto and viola (1979); American Composers Alliance; Frogpeak
     Two for One for violin and viola (1980); Composer Facsimile Edition; Frogpeak
 Jeanne Singer (1924–2000)
     Recollections of City Island for oboe, viola and piano (1984)
     Sonnet for voice, violin and clarinet (or viola) (1985); Accentuate Music
 Alvin Singleton (b. 1940)
     Argoru IV for viola solo (1978); European American Music
     Mookestueck for 5-string electric viola (1999); Schott Music
 Larry Sitsky (b. 1934)
     Improvisation and Cadenza for solo viola (1964); Wirripang; Australian Music Centre
     2 Pieces for viola solo (2006); Keys Press; Australian Music Centre
        Diaspora
        Niggun
     7 Zen Songs for voice and viola (2005); Keys Press; Australian Music Centre
 Hans Sitt (1850–1922)
     6 Albumblätter (Album Leaves) for viola and piano, Op. 39 (1891)
     Concerto in A minor for viola and orchestra, Op. 68 (1900)
     Concertstück (Concert Piece) in G minor for viola and piano, Op. 46 (1892), or viola and orchestra (1899)
     15 Etudes for viola solo, Op. 116 (1913)
     24 Etudes for viola solo, Op. 32; original for violin
     3 Fantasiestücke (3 Fantasy Pieces) for viola and piano, Op. 58 (1894)
     Gavotte und Mazurka for viola and piano, Op. 132 (1919)
     Konzertstück: Allegro appassionato, Romanze und Tarantelle for violin or viola and orchestra (or piano), Op. 119 (1916)
     Romance in G minor for viola and orchestra, Op. 72 (1900)
     Romanze in D minor for viola and piano, Op. 102 No. 1 (1909); original from Drei Stücke (3 Pieces) for violin and piano; transcription by the composer
     3 Stücke (3 Pieces) for viola and piano, Op. 75 (1901)
 Pavel Šivic (1908–1995)
     Narodna (Folk Tune) for viola and piano (1972); Edicije Društva Slovenskih Skladateljev
 Fredrik Sixten (b. 1962)
     Mesto for viola and piano (1982); Gehrmans Musikförlag
 Nikos Skalkottas (1904–1949)
     Concerto for violin, viola and wind orchestra, A/K25 (1939); Margun Music
     Duo for violin and viola, A/K45 (1938); Universal Edition
 Howard Skempton (b. 1947)
     Intermezzo for viola and horn (1978)
     Moto perpetuo for viola solo (1993)
     Only the Sound Remains for viola and chamber ensemble (2010); Oxford University Press
     Pavillon for clarinet, viola and piano (2006)
 Lucijan Marija Škerjanc (1900–1973)
     Elegija (Elegy) for viola and piano
     Koncertantna rapsodija (Concertant Rhapsody) for viola and orchestra (1959)
 Yngve Sköld (1899–1992)
     Adagio patetico for viola and piano (1920); Swedish Music Information Centre
     Alla leggenda for viola and organ, Op. 31 (1931); Swedish Music Information Centre
     Consolation for viola and organ or small orchestra (1945); Swedish Music Information Centre
     Elegie for violin, viola and organ (1926); Swedish Music Information Centre
     Fantasi (Fantasy) for viola and organ, Op. 12 (1919); Swedish Music Information Centre
     Impromptu for horn or viola and piano, Op. 76 (1979); Swedish Music Information Centre
     Klassisk svit (Classical Suite) for violin and viola (1945); Swedish Music Information Centre
     Legend for viola and orchestra, Op. 9 (c.1917); Swedish Music Information Centre
     Romans (Romance) for viola and piano (1916); Swedish Music Information Centre
     Serenad for piccolo, violin and viola, Op. 27 (1927); Swedish Music Information Centre
     Sonata for viola and organ (or piano), Op. 62 (1962); Swedish Music Information Centre
     Sonatina for flute and viola; Swedish Music Information Centre
     Suite Concertante for viola and orchestra, Op. 35 (1936); Swedish Music Information Centre
 Bettina Skrzypczak (b. 1962)
     Arcato for viola solo (2000); Ricordi Verlag, München
     Landschaft des Augenblicks, 5 Songs for mezzo-soprano, viola and piano (1991–1992); Ricordi Verlag, München
 Scott Slapin (b. 1974)
     12 Divertimenti for 2 violas, student and teacher (2015); Violacentric Publications
     24 Etudes for 2 violas, student and teacher; Ourtext Edition
     Ballade for 2 violas (2016); Violacentric Publications
     Capricious: In Memory of Emanuel Vardi for 3 violas (2011); American Viola Society
     Cremonus in Italy for 4 violas or viola ensemble (2017); Violacentric Publications
        Part I Cremonus Goes to the Movies
        Part II Reflection at the Chiesa di Cremono
        Part III Concert of ex-Soviet Violists in the Piazza del Duomo
        Part IV Cremonus Attempts a Tarantella After Too Much Vino Rosso, Reminisces About the Movies
     Cremonus' Revenge for 2 or 8 solo violas and full orchestra, 3 movements (2017); Violacentric Publications
     Dead of Winter for 2 violas (2016); Violacentric Publications
     Dialogues and Duels for viola ensemble, from Violacentrism the Opera (2015); Ourtext Edition
     Elegy for 2 violas and doublebass (2006)
     Fanfare for a New Library for 2 violas (2016); Violacentric Publications
     Fanfare for an Old Library for 2 violas (2016); Violacentric Publications
     Fanfare for Cremonus for 4 violas or viola ensemble (2017); Violacentric Publications
     Fantasia in C Minor for solo viola (2016); Violacentric Publications
     Five Pieces for a Memorial Concert (2008)
        In Memoriam; for My Mother, Margi for 2 violas; Ourtext Edition
        Elegy-Caprice for viola solo; Ourtext Edition
        Intermezzo for flute and 2 violas; Ourtext Edition
        Serenade for 2 violas
        Postlude for viola and string quintet or orchestra; American Viola Society
     The Ill-Tempered Violist for solo viola (2016); Violacentric Publications
     Music History 101 at 9 am for 3 violas (2015); Ourtext Edition
     Nocturne in Memory of Richard Lane, Duo for 2 violas (2004); Ourtext Edition
     Polysemic Rhapsody for viola and cello (2017); Violacentric Publications
     Prelude for 2 violas (2016); Violacentric Publications
     Recitative for viola solo (2007); Liben Music Publishers
     Sketches for 4 violas or viola ensemble (2011); Ourtext Edition
     Soliloquy for viola solo (2007)
     Sonata in C for 2 violas, 3 movements (2016); Violacentric Publications
     Sonata in G for violin and viola (2016); Violacentric Publications
     Sonatina for 2 violas, 4 movements (2016); Violacentric Publications
     Suite for 2 violas, or viola solo with viola ensemble (2007); Ourtext Edition; American Viola Society
     Suspension for 2 violas (2016); Violacentric Publications
     Three Contrasts for Two Violas for 2 violas, 3 movements (2016); Violacentric Publications
     Threnody and Reverie for viola and piano (2017); Violacentric Publications
     Trio Sonata for viola, alto sax (or viola), and piano (2016); Violacentric Publications
     Triptych (1997)
        A Crooked Dance for viola, cello and doublebass
        A Lament for viola and cello
        The Hassid and the Hayseed for viola and cello; Ourtext Edition
     Two Processionals for 2 violas (2006)
     A Viola Audition for 4 violas or viola ensemble (2017); Violacentric Publications
     Violacentrism The Opera for 2 violas (2015); Violacentric Publications
        Overture for 2 violas
        The Raging Waves of Babylon for solo viola
        Three Arias for 2 violas
        Music History 101 for 2 violas
        The Sounds of Hampshire County for 2 violas
        Violist Under the Roof for 2 violas
        Dialogues and Duels for 2 violas 
     Viola Demo for 2 violas (2012)
     Violist Under the Roof for string trio (2017); Violacentric Publications
     Yizkor for 2 violas (2016); Violacentric Publications
 Klement Slavický (1910–1999)
     Rhapsodie for solo viola (1987); Český Hudební Fond
 Sergei Slonimsky (1932–2020)
     3 Graces: Suite in the Form of Variations after Botticelli, Rodin and Picasso (Три грации, Сюита в форме вариаций по мотивам Ботичелли, Родена и Пикассо) for viola and piano (2002); Compozitor Publishing House
     2 Pieces (Две пьесы) for viola and piano (1956); Muzgiz
     Suite for viola and piano (1959); Sovietsky Kompozitor
     Tragicomedy (Трагикомедия), Concerto for viola and chamber orchestra (2005); Compozitor Publishing House
 Dmitri Smirnov (1948–2020)
     Adagiosissimo after J.S. Bach for violin, viola and harp, Op. 36b (1997); Meladina Press
     Chaconne for violin, viola and harp, Op. 131 (2001); Meladina Press
     The Farewell Song (Прощальная Песнь) for viola and harp, Op. 37 (1982); Meladina Press; Hans Sikorski
     The Last Word 1 for 2 violas and wind quintet (alto flute, oboe d'amour, bass clarinet, contrabassoon, horn), Op. 133 (2002); Meladina Press
     The Last Word 1 for violin, viola (or 2 violas) and harp, Op. 133a (2002); Meladina Press
     Pro et contra (За и против), 2 Pieces for viola and piano (2014)
     Shadows in Light (Освещённые Тени) for viola and harp, Op. 122 (1999); Meladina Press; Sibelius Music
 Leo Smit (1900–1943)
     Concerto for viola and string orchestra (1940); Donemus
     Trio for clarinet, viola and piano (1938); Donemus
     Trio for flute, viola and harp (1926); Donemus
 Leo Smit (1921–1999)
     Alone for female violist/reciter (1988); poem by Emily Dickinson; Theodore Presser Company
     Petals of Amaranth, 10 Pieces for viola and piano (1995)
     Scena Cambiata for trombone, viola and cello (1980)
 Dave Smith (b. 1949)
     Zosonata for viola solo (1993)
 David Stanley Smith (1877–1949)
     Sonata for viola and piano, Op. 72 (1934)
 Julia Smith (1905–1989)
     Two Pieces for viola and piano (1966); Mowbray Music Publishers; Theodore Presser Company
 Leland Smith (1925–2013)
     Sonata for heckelphone or viola and piano (1953); San Andreas Press
     Suite for solo viola (1948); San Andreas Press
 Stuart Saunders Smith (b. 1948)
     Three for Two for violin and viola (1972); Smith Publications
 Michael Smither (b. 1939)
     Four Pieces for violin and viola (1974); Centre for New Zealand Music
 Ethel Smyth (1858–1944)
     Two Interlinked French Folk Melodies for violin or viola and piano (1927); Oxford University Press

So
 Gintaras Sodeika (b. 1961)
     Maranata for viola and string orchestra (2003)
 Ragnar Søderlind (b. 1945)
     Concerto "Nostalgia delle radici" for viola and orchestra, Op. 86 (2002–2003); Music Information Centre Norway
     Friesische Landschaft for viola and piano, Op. 78
 Lille Bror Söderlundh (1912–1957)
     Siciliana seria for viola and string orchestra (1946); Swedish Music Information Centre
     Zwei Inventionen (Two Inventions) for clarinet or viola and piano (organ ad libitum) (1955); Hans Busch Musikförlag; Swedish Music Information Centre
 Naresh Sohal (1939–2018)
     Concerto for viola and orchestra (2002); Naresh Sohal Publications
     Shades IV for viola solo (1982–1983); Novello & Co.
 Ivan Sokolov (b. 1960)
     Elegy (Элегия) for viola solo (2001)
     13 Postludes (13 Постлюдий) for viola and piano (2018)
     Sonata for flute, viola and harp (2012)
     Sonata in One Movement (Соната для альта и фортепиано. Одночастная) for viola and piano (2006)
 Juan María Solare (b. 1966)
     Al octavo día (On the Eighth Day), Monologue for viola and piano (1993)
     Ambos lados del ocaso (Both Sides of Twilight), Song for soprano and viola (1989)
     Astat (Haiku Nr. 7) for viola solo (2009)
     Bei jedem Wetter (Regardless of the Weather) for viola, cello and piano (2010)
     Caminata nocturna (por Colonia) for 2 violas (2002, 2007); original for piano
     Drooping Drops for viola, piano and tape (2001, 2006); original for bassoon, piano and tape
     Hypnosis (in Another Room) for viola solo (2004)
     Fricción for 2 violas (2010, 2011)
     Lark in the Dark for 2 violas (2002, 2007); original for piano
     Momificación de una rosa (Mummification of a Rose) for 1 or 2 violas (2004); original version for violin(s)
     Nana for viola and cello (1997)
     Paregamutiún (Friendship), 4 Pieces for viola solo (2010); original for cello solo
     Reencuentro (Reunion) for viola and piano (2008–2010)
     Sonatango for 4 violas (2002, 2008); original for piano
     Temperamentos, 4 Pieces for viola and piano (2010, 2011)
     Toccata y Fuga lejanas for viola and guitar (1987)
     Tránsfuga, Tanguistic Fugue for violin and viola (2007, 2009) or for flute and viola (2010); original version for saxophone and piano
     Trenodia for viola solo (1989)
     Tres veces Dos Dúos (Three Times Two Duos), 6 Pieces for violin and viola (1994–1996)
     Tríptico existencial for clarinet and viola (2010)
     Vineta for viola and piano (2008, 2009); original for cello and piano
     Un eremita for viola and piano (2005)
 Alessandro Solbiati (b. 1956)
     Blütenstaub for violin, viola and piano (1982); Edizioni Suvini Zerboni
     Corde for viola solo (1991); Edizioni Suvini Zerboni
     Volo for soprano and viola (2005); Edizioni Suvini Zerboni
 Josep Soler i Sardà (1935–2022)
     Aux soirs ensanglantés de roses... for viola and clarinet (1998)
     Concerto for viola and orchestra (1979)
     Pieza para viola sola for viola solo (1987)
     Poema de Vilafranca for viola, oboe, English horn, organ and chamber orchestra (1995)
     Sonata No. 1 "sobre un tema de Giuseppe Verdi" ("on a Theme of Giuseppe Verdi") for viola and piano (1993–1994); Clivis Publicacions
     Sonata No. 2 for viola and piano
     Variacions sobre un tema d'Alban Berg (Variations on a Theme of Alban Berg) for viola and piano (1979); Clivis Publicacions
 Harvey Sollberger (b. 1938)
     Composition for viola and piano (1961); American Composers Alliance
 Giovanni Sollima (b. 1962)
     Lamentatio for viola solo (1998); Casa Musicale Sonzogno
 Herbert Söllner (b. 1942)
     Andante for violin and cello (or viola) (1992)
     Cantus, Duo for viola and cello (1993)
     Centum for violin and viola (1999)
     Duo for viola and piano (1991)
     Duo for violin and viola (1977, 1982)
     Ende und Anfang (End and Beginning) for viola and harp (2003)
     Kippenheimer Synagoge 2003 for violin, viola and double bass (2003)
     Sonata for viola and piano (1987–1988)
     Sonata for viola and piano (2004)
     Tabea for viola solo (1980); G. Bosse-Verlag
     Vier Lieder (4 Songs) for soprano, viola and piano (1982, 1992)
 Arthur Somervell (1863–1937)
     School of Melody, 10 Progressive Tunes for viola and piano (1919); Augener
 József Soproni (1930–2021)
     Concerto for viola and orchestra (1959); Zeneműkiadó Vállalat, Budapest; Editio Musica Budapest
     Rapszódia (Rhapsody) for viola and piano (1984); Editio Musica Budapest
     Sonatina for viola and piano (1958); Zeneműkiadó Vállalat, Budapest; Editio Musica Budapest
 Bent Sørensen (b. 1958)
     Funeral Procession for violin, viola and chamber ensemble (1989); Edition Wilhelm Hansen
     The Lady and the Lark for viola and ensemble (1997); Edition Wilhelm Hansen
     The Lady of Shalott for viola solo (1987); Edition Wilhelm Hansen
     Mondnacht for clarinet, viola and piano (2007); Edition Wilhelm Hansen
     Sarabande for viola solo (2015); Edition Wilhelm Hansen
     Schattenlinie for clarinet, viola and piano (2010); Edition Wilhelm Hansen
 Mauricio Sotelo (b. 1961)
     Blanca Luz de Azahar for viola and piano (2016); Proyecto Sotelo
     Muros de dolor... VII: Bulería for viola solo (2018); Universal Edition
     Trio Basso for viola, cello and double bass (1899–1989); Ariadne Verlag
 Vladimír Soukup (1930–2012)
     Sonata for viola and piano (1961); Český Hudební Fond
 Marcelle Soulage (1894–1970)
     Sonata for viola and piano, Op. 25 (1919); Buffet-Crampon, Paris
     Sonata in F major for viola solo, Op. 43 (1921); Buffet-Crampon, Paris
 André Souris (1899–1970)
     Trois pièces anciennes for violin and viola (1965); CeBeDeM
 Tim Souster (1943–1994)
     Songs of Three Seasons for soprano and viola (1965, revised 1977); 0dB Editions; British Music Information Centre
     Spectral for viola and electronics (1972); 0dB Editions; British Music Information Centre
 Ann Southam (1937–2010)
     Re-tuning for viola and tape (1985); Canadian Music Centre
 Leo Sowerby (1895–1968)
     Ballade for viola and organ, H. 300 (1949); Fred Bock Music Publishers
     Poem for viola and organ or orchestra, H. 258 (1941, orchestrated 1947); Sowerby Foundation; Theodore Presser Company
     Sonata for clarinet or viola and piano, H. 240 (1938); Theodore Presser Company
     Trio for flute, viola and piano, H. 149; Sowerby Foundation
 Bernadette Speach (b. 1948)
     Embrace the Universe for mezzo-soprano, viola, piano, chorus and orchestra (2001)
     Trio des trois II for flute, viola and harp (1991)
     Trio des trois III for viola, cello and piano (1992)
     Viola for viola and piano (1999)
 Johannes Matthias Sperger (1750–1812)
     Concerto in E major for viola and orchestra
     Sonata No. 1 in D major for viola and double bass, T. 38, Meier C I/6 (C I/7?)
     Sonata No. 2 in D major for viola and double bass, T. 39, Meier C I/9
 Claudio Spies (1925–2020)
     Viopiacem, Duo for viola and piano or harpsichord (1965); Boosey & Hawkes
 Leo Spies (1899–1965)
     Concerto in E minor for viola and piano (1961)
     Fünf Sommerbilder (5 Summer Pictures) for viola and piano (1954); Breitkopf & Härtel
 Louis Spohr (1784–1859)
     Grand Duo in E minor for violin and viola, Op. 13 (1809)
     3 Duos for 2 violas, Op. 3; transcribed by Louis Pagels; Edition Praeger & Meier
 Norbert Sprongl (1892–1983)
     Sonata for viola and piano, Op. 115 (1958); Doblinger Verlag
     Suite for viola and piano, Op. 142
     Vier Stücke (4 Pieces) for viola and piano, Op. 49

St
 Gerhard Stäbler (b. 1949)
     Notebook for viola and orchestra (1996–2000); Ricordi
     Schmerzprobe (Pain Test), Cassandra Study for solo viola (1993); Ricordi
 Marek Stachowski (1936–2004)
     Concerto for viola and string orchestra (1998); Polskie Wydawnictwo Muzyczne
 Hans Stadlmair (1929–2019)
     Drei Fantasien (3 Fantasies) for viola solo (1973); Henry Litolff's Verlag; C.F. Peters
     Orpheus-Legende for viola and fortepiano (1993)
     Sonata for viola solo (1960); Breitkopf & Härtel
     Sonata da Chiesa for viola and organ (1981)
 Klaus Hinrich Stahmer (b. 1941)
     Dedications, Concerto for viola, harp and string orchestra (1964, 1977); Möseler Wolfenbüttel
     Mazewot for viola solo (2001); Verlag Neue Musik
     One Stops Searching, One Grows Silent for viola and guitar (2009); Verlag Neue Musik
     Rapsodia Piccola for alto saxophone (or viola) and piano (1976); Heinrichshofen's Verlag
     Sonatina for violin and viola (1964); Möseler Wolfenbüttel
     Threnos in Memoriam Paul Hindemith for viola and organ or piano (1963); N. Simrock
 Anton Stamitz (1750 or 1754–1798 or 1809)
     Concerto in B major for viola and orchestra
 Carl Stamitz (1745–1801)
     Concerto No. 1 in D major for viola and orchestra, Op. 1 (published 1774)
     Concerto No. 2 in B major for viola and orchestra (c.1770); Gems Music Publications
     Concerto No. 3 in A major for viola and orchestra; Gems Music Publications
     6 Duos for 2 violas; Edition Schott
     6 Duos for violin and viola, Op. 1; Amadeus Verlag
     3 Duos for violin and viola, Op. 10 (c.1773)
     3 Duos for violin and viola, Op. 12; Gems Music Publications
     6 Duos for violin and viola, Op. 18 (c.1778); Verlag von F.E.C. Leuckart
     6 Duos for violin and viola, Op. 19; Gems Music Publications
     6 Duos for violin and viola, Op. 23; Gems Music Publications
     6 Duos "Le Jeune" for violin and viola; Gems Music Publications
     Sinfonia Concertante [No. 11] in A major for violin, viola, cello and orchestra (published 1784)
     Sinfonia Concertante [No. 7] in D major for 2 violins, viola and orchestra
     Sinfonia Concertante in D major for violin, viola and orchestra (1780–1782)
     Sonata in B major for viola and piano, Op. 6
 Johann Stamitz (1717–1757)
     Concerto in G major for viola and string orchestra; original for flute and string orchestra
     Sonata in G major for viola and piano, Op. 6a; original for violin and basso continuo; transcription by Vadim Borisovsky (published 1956)
 Charles Villiers Stanford (1852–1924)
     Sonata for clarinet (or viola) and piano, Op. 129 (1911) (viola version adapted by Harry Waldo Warner)
 Paul Stanhope (b. 1969)
     Dawn Lament for viola solo (1999); Australian Music Centre
     Shadow Dancing for clarinet, viola and piano (2001); Australian Music Centre
 Yevhen Stankovych (b. 1942)
     Concerto for viola and orchestra (1999); Sordino Ediziuns Musicalas
     Flowering Garden and Apples Falling into the Water... (Квітучий сад і яблука, що падають у воду …), Trio for clarinet, viola and piano (1996)
     Mountain Legend (Гірська легенда) for viola and piano (2003)
     Symphony-Concerto (Симфонія-концерт), Concerto No. 2 for viola and orchestra (2004)
 Helen Stanley (b. 1930)
     Concerto Romantico for viola and orchestra
 Robert Starer (1924–2001)
     Concerto for viola, strings and percussion (1958); Leeds Music
     Duo for violin and viola (1954); Southern Music Publishing
     Elegy for violin or viola and piano (1985); MMB Music
 Christoph Staude (b. 1965)
     Nachbild for viola solo (1986); Edition Pro Nova, Sonoton Music
 Walter Steffens (b. 1934)
     Guernica, Elegie for viola and orchestra, Op. 32 (1974–1978); Edition Wilhelm Hansen
 Leon Stein (1910–2002)
     Duo Concertante for viola and cello (1978); American Composers Alliance
     Sonata for solo viola (1969); Dorn Publications; American Composers Alliance
 Ben Steinberg (b. 1930)
     Suite for flute, viola and harp (1981); Canadian Music Centre
     Three Songs for flute, viola and harp (1975); Canadian Music Centre
 Eitan Steinberg  (b. 1955)
     The Fool, Miniature Opera for voice, viola and percussion (2007)
     In a Hidden Cleft among Cliffs a Gazelle Drinks Water for voice and viola (or for voice, viola and string orchestra) (1996)
     Rava Deravin for viola and string quartet (2001, 2003)
     Song of the Bride's Mother for voice and 3 violas (1994)
     Variousrespirations for voice, viola and orchestra (1997, 2004)
 Timo Steiner (b. 1976)
     Kena on sind kuulata (It's Nice to Listen to You) for viola and piano (2004)
 Roger Steptoe (b. 1953)
     3 Paul Verlaine Songs (3 French Songs) for mezzo-soprano, viola and piano (2009); words by Paul Verlaine; Editions BIM
     3 Pieces for viola and piano (1982); Stainer & Bell
     Sonata for viola and piano (2010); Editions BIM
     Sonatine 1 (Une petite sonatine) for solo viola (2009); Editions BIM
 Johann Franz Xaver Sterkel (1750–1817)
     6 Duette for violin and viola, Op. 8; Edition Schott
 Max Stern (b. 1947)
     Bedouin Impressions (רשמים בדואים) for viola solo (1998); Or-Tav Music Publications
 Bernard Stevens (1916–1983)
     Improvisation for solo viola, Op. 48 (1973); Roberton Publications
 Halsey Stevens (1908–1989)
     Concerto for viola and orchestra (1976?); American Composers Alliance
     Eight Canons for 2 violas (1969); American Composers Alliance
     Serenade for viola and piano (1944); Editio Helios
     Sonata for viola and piano (1950); American Composers Alliance
     Suite for clarinet (or viola) and piano (1945, revised 1953); C.F. Peters
     Suite for viola and piano (1957–1959); Peermusic
     Three Hungarian Folk Songs for viola and piano (1950); ECS Publishing
 James Stevens (1923–2012)
     Four Movements and a Coda for viola and piano (1953); King Watts & Co.; Edition Modern
 Ronald Stevenson (1928–2015)
     Recitative and Air on DSCH: In Memoriam Shostakovich for viola and piano (1974, 1987); original version for piano solo; Ronald Stevenson Society; Scottish Music Centre
 Robert Still (1910–1971
     Sonata No. 1 for viola and piano
     Sonata No. 2 for viola and piano (1953?); Chester Music
     Sonata No. 3 for viola and piano
     Viola Concerto (unfinished – 1 movement completed and 1 incomplete)
 David Stock (1939–2015)
     Concerto for viola and orchestra (1997); MMB Music; Lauren Keiser Music Publishing
     Eitz Chayim (Tree of Life) for viola and piano (2004); MMB Music; Lauren Keiser Music Publishing
     South Wind for viola solo (2001); MMB Music; Lauren Keiser Music Publishing
     A Vanished World for flute, viola and harp (1999); MMB Music; Lauren Keiser Music Publishing
 Karlheinz Stockhausen (1928–2007)
     In Freundschaft (In Friendship) for viola solo, Werk 466/7 (1977); Stockhausen-Verlag
     Laub und Regen (Leaves and Rain), Final duet from Herbstmusik (Autumn Music) for clarinet and viola, Werk 40 (1974); Stockhausen-Verlag
     Plus-Minus for viola solo, Werk 14 (1963); Universal Edition
     Solo for a melody instrument and feedback (live electronics), Werk 19 (1965–1966); Universal Edition
     Spiral for a soloist with short-wave receiver, Werk 27 (1968); Universal Edition
 Wolfgang Stockmeier (1931–2015)
     3 Stücke (3 Pieces) for flute, viola and organ (1968); Möseler Verlag
 Petar Stojanović (1877–1957)
     Sonata in C major for viola and piano, Op. 97
 Zygmunt Stojowski (1870–1946)
     Fantazja (Fantasia) for viola and piano, Op. 27 (1905); Polskie Wydawnictwo Muzyczne
 Harvey Stokes
     Sonata for viola and piano (2000–2001); Seesaw Music
 Pete Stollery (b. 1960)
     Thickness for flute, viola and tape (2000); Scottish Music Centre
 Alan Stout (1932–2018)
     Velut umbra, Hymn for flute, viola and chamber ensemble, Op. 35a (1961); American Composers Alliance
 Ulrich Stranz (1946–2004)
     Auguri, Music for viola and small orchestra (1981); Bärenreiter-Verlag
     Doppelkonzert (Double Concerto) for violin, viola and string orchestra (1988)
     Fünf Moments musicaux for 2 violins and viola (1969); Bärenreiter-Verlag
     Guter Dinge sein for flute and viola (1998); Bärenreiter-Verlag
     Portrait for viola solo (2003); Bärenreiter-Verlag
 Igor Stravinsky (1882–1971)
     Élégie (Элегия) for viola solo (1944); Boosey & Hawkes
     Pastorale (Пастораль) for viola and piano (1907); transcription for viola and piano by Vadim Borisovsky;  (State Music Publishing House)
 Soulima Stravinsky (1910–1994)
     Suite for viola solo (1975); C.F. Peters
 John Stringer (b. 1967)
     The Shifting Point for viola and piano (2001); University of York Music Press
 Aurel Stroe (1932–2008)
     Pe drumul către focurile cereşti (Journey to Celestial Fires; Auf dem Weg zu Höhenfeuern) for viola solo (1979)
 George Templeton Strong (1856–1948)
     Berceuse for violin, viola or cello and orchestra (1927)
     Sérénade for cello (or viola) and harp (1929)
     Sonata in G minor for viola and cello (1916)
     Trio "Der Dorfmusikdirektor" for 2 violins and viola (published 1915)
 Gustav Strube (1867–1953)
     Berceuse for viola and piano (1908); G. Schirmer
     Fantastic Dance for viola and orchestra (1906)
     Longing for viola and orchestra (1905)
     Regrets for viola and piano (1933); American Viola Society Publications
     Sonata in D minor for viola and piano (1925); G. Schirmer
     Sonatina for viola and piano (1943); G. Schirmer
 Clive Strutt (b. 1942)
     Soliloquy for viola solo (1963); Scottish Music Centre
 Joachim Stutschewsky (1891–1982)
     Andante religioso for viola (or cello) and piano (1970); Or-Tav Music Publications
     Elegy for viola solo (1982); Or-Tav Music Publications
     Kol Nidrei for viola (or cello) and piano (1973); Or-Tav Music Publications
     Soliloquia for viola solo (1968); Or-Tav Music Publications

Su
 Morton Subotnick (b. 1933)
     An Arsenal of Defense for viola and "electronic ghost score" (1982); Theodore Presser Company
     Sonata for viola and piano (1958); McGinnis & Marx
 Martin Suckling (b. 1981)
     Gemini, Concerto for 2 violas (2005, revised 2006); Scottish Music Centre
 Robert Suderburg (1936–2013)
     Chamber Music VI, Three Movements for viola and double bass (1980); Theodore Presser Company
     Solo Music II: "Ritual Cycle of Lyrics and Dance" for unaccompanied viola (1988–1989); Theodore Presser Company
 Miklós Sugár (b. 1952)
     Ballada for 2 violas (1981); Editio Musica Budapest
     Marionettjáték (Marionette Game) for viola and CD (2008)
     Réminiscences for clarinet, viola and piano (1984)
 Balduin Sulzer (1932–2019)
     Aria for viola solo, Op. 42 (1975)
     Bagatelle for viola and piano, Op. 238 (2003)
     Concerto for viola and chamber orchestra, Op. 24 (1973)
     Fantasie for viola and piano 4-hands, Op. 297 (2007)
     Fünf Bouffonerien for viola and piano, Op. 78 (1981)
     3 Gesänge (3 Songs) on texts of Rose Ausländer for soprano and viola, Op. 196 (1998)
     Lied ohne Worte (Song without Words) for viola and piano, Op. 222 (2002)
     4 Meditationen on texts of Paul Varga for mezzo-soprano, viola and piano, Op. 276 (2006)
     Mutwilligkeiten for viola and percussion trio, Op. 290 (2007)
     Pasticcio zum Thema "Regen" for mezzo-soprano, viola and piano, Op. 217 (2001–2002)
 Lepo Sumera (1950–2000)
     Boris Björn Baggerile ja tema sõbrale (For Boris Björn Bagger and His Friend) for viola and guitar (1988, 1991); also versions for other instruments
     Quasi improvisata I for viola and piano (1983, 1993); original for violin and piano; Edition 49
 Muammer Sun (1932–2021)
     Söyleşi (Conversation) for viola solo (1977–1978)
 Franz Surges (1958–2015)
     Hoffnungs-Schimmer (Glimmer of Hope) for viola and organ (2003); Edition Dohr
     Nebel-Fassaden (Fog-Facades) for flute, viola and snare drum (2004); Edition Dohr
 Viktor Suslin (1942–2012)
     Begegnung, Trio for baritone, viola and cello (1988)
     Gioco Appassionato for 4 violas (1974)
     Grenzübertritt (Crossing Beyond), Trio for viola, cello and double bass (1990); Edition Sikorski
     Sonata Capricciosa for viola and harpsichord (1986); Edition Sikorski
 Margaret Sutherland (1897–1984)
     6 Bagatelles for violin and viola (1956); Australian Music Centre
     Sonata for viola (or clarinet) and piano (1949); Australian Music Centre
 Louis Svečenski (1862–1926)
     25 Technical Exercises for viola (1917); G. Schirmer
 Atli Heimir Sveinsson (1938–2019)
     Cathexis for viola and piano (1977–1978); Íslensk tónverkamiðstöð
     Dúó Rapp for viola and double bass (2004); Íslensk tónverkamiðstöð
     Könnun (Exploration) for viola and orchestra (1971); Íslensk tónverkamiðstöð
     Minning II (Manuela in Memoriam) for bass flute, viola and harp (2006); Íslensk tónverkamiðstöð
     Þrjú sönglög (3 Songs) for low voice, viola and piano (2000); Íslensk tónverkamiðstöð
     Sonata for viola solo (2002); Íslensk tónverkamiðstöð
     Sonata for viola and piano (2011); Íslensk tónverkamiðstöð
     Springsongs I-IV and Minning (Manuela in Memoriam) for flute, viola and harp (2006); Íslensk tónverkamiðstöð
 Evgeny Svetlanov (1928–2002)
     Aria (Ария) for viola and piano
 Tomáš Svoboda (1939–2022)
     Forest Rhythms for flute, viola and xylophone, Op. 150 (1995); Thomas C. Stangland Co.
     Sonata for viola and piano, Op. 36 (1961); Thomas C. Stangland Co.
 Freda Swain (1902–1985)
     English Reel for viola and piano (1958); J. Williams
     Song at Evening for viola and piano (1958); J. Williams
 Józef Świder (1930–2014)
     Wokaliza (Vocalise) for soprano and viola (1953)
 Jay Sydeman (1928–2021)
     Auld Lang Sydeman for violin and viola (ca. 1993)
     Concerto da Camera for viola and chamber ensemble (1968); Okra Music Corporation; Seesaw Music Corporation
     Duo for 2 violas (ca. 1985)
     Duo for flute and viola (ca. 1982)
     Duo for viola and harpsichord (or piano) (1967); Okra Music Corporation; Seesaw Music Corporation
     Duo for violin and viola (ca. 1970)
     Duo No. 1 for viola and cello (ca. 1984)
     Duo No. 2 for viola and cello (ca. 1986)
     2 Duos for violin and viola (1991)
     Momo Duo for violin and viola (1991)
     Music for viola, winds and percussion (1971); Okra Music Corporation; Seesaw Music Corporation
     2 Pieces for viola and piano (ca. 1992)
     The Place of Blue Flowers for narrator and viola
     Pops Wedding Music for violin and viola (ca. 1994–1995)
     A Prayer for alto, viola and piano (ca. 1983)
     Prelude for viola and cello (1983)
     Sonata No. 1 for viola and piano (ca. 1990)
     Sonata No. 2 for viola and piano (ca. 1992)
     Sonata No. 3 for viola and piano (ca. 1994)
     Trio for 2 violins and viola (ca. 1986)
     Trio for 3 violas (ca. 1985)
     Trio for viola, cello and piano (1985)
     Variations for viola and bassoon (1955); American Music Center Library
 Ferenc Szabó (1902–1969)
     Air for viola and piano (1953); original for violin and piano; Zeneműkiadó
     Szerenád (Serenade) for flute and viola (1974); Editio Musica Budapest
 Iris Szeghy (b. 1956)
     Ciaccona (Chaconne) for viola solo (1991); Tonger Verlag
 Gusztáv Szerémi (1877–1952)
     Concerto No. 1 in F major for viola (viola alto) and orchestra, Op. 6 (published 1890s)
     Concerto No. 2 in B major for viola (viola alto) and orchestra, Op. 57 (1911)
     Rêverie for viola (viola alto) and piano, Op. 2
     Trois morceaux lyriques (3 Lyric Pieces) for viola (viola alto) and piano, Op. 33
 Erzsébet Szőnyi (1924–2019)
     Berceuse for viola and piano; Collection Panorama: Œuvres Contemporaines, Volume 1 (1987); Éditions Gérard Billaudot
     Duo for violin and viola (1958); Editio Musica Budapest
      Francia szvit (French Suite) for viola and piano (1984); Editio Musica Budapest

References

External links
 Free scores featuring the viola at the International Music Score Library Project

 
Viola S